John Mew (born 1928) is a British orthodontist. He is the originator of orthotropics (also known as Mewing), a controversial form of oral posture training that claims to guide facial growth that is not supported by mainstream orthodontists.

Career 

Mew was educated at Rose Hill preparatory school in Tunbridge Wells (1935–1942) and then at Tonbridge School (1942–1945). He subsequently graduated in dentistry at University College London (1948–1953), and then trained in Orthognathic surgery at Queen Victoria Hospital, East Grinstead (1953–1956). He has written two textbooks and published many articles internationally on this subject. He became president of the Southern Counties Branch of the British Dental Association in 1971. Over the last twenty years he has spent much of his time lecturing about his techniques. Currently he is professor of Orthotropics at the London School of Facial Orthotropics, and was granted an honorary Visiting Professorship at the University of Medicine and Pharmacy, Timișoara, Romania, for teaching students there. He has been honored with life membership of the British Dental Association, a Paul Harris fellowship from International Rotary, Fellowship of the International College of Dentists, and Outstanding Achievement Awards from the International Functional Association and the International Orthodontic Society.

Mew held a two-year visiting professorship at Victor Babeș University of Medicine and Pharmacy, Timișoara, Romania. He got life membership of the British Dental Association in 1999.

In 2010, the General Dental Council (GDC) reprimanded Mew for running advertisements, which stated that the GDC was deliberately suppressing his theories. Mew did not dispute the charge and referred to himself as a "whistleblower".

In 2013, Mew received an award at the American Academy of Physiological Medicine and Dentistry.

Orthotropics 
Orthotropics is Mew's orthodontic method claimed to be able to guide facial growth. Mew's orthodontic methods have consisted of widening and advancing the upper jaw using palatal expanders, changing the patient's diet, and having the patient adopt a myofunctionally correct resting place for the tongue, where he argues it provides an outward force able to laterally expand the upper jaw in a growing child, gradually resulting in a 'natural' cure of the malocclusion.

Mew believes that the etiology of malocclusion is environmental and that environment decides whether or not teeth are crooked. In contrast, mainstream orthodontics attributes crooked teeth primarily to genetics. Prominent scientists and researchers point out that hunter-gatherers always had room for all 32 teeth. Work by paleoanthropologists such as Daniel Lieberman and Peter Ungar independently corroborate Mew's theory that human jaws are growing more narrow and teeth are becoming more crowded due to lifestyle and not genetics. Stanford University's Paul Ehrlich co-wrote the book Jaws, which outlines an epidemic of dysfunction and disease resulting from the shrinking jaws of post-Industrialized society.

Mew became concerned by the orthodontic outcomes of some of his patients.  He observed that the mechanics of orthodontic treatment, while straightening the teeth, did not address the underlying cause of the dental overcrowding and, in some cases, caused facial damage. He concluded that extractions, fixed appliances with elastics and retractive headgear could be harmful to facial growth. In 1958 John Mew put forward The Tropic Premise, which argued that malocclusion was a ‘postural deformity’, that overcrowded teeth were not necessarily inherited and that, consequently, malocclusion could be avoided with early intervention to correct oral posture and function.

As part of his search for an approach to orthodontics that did not cause facial retraction, John Mew visited Rolf Fränkel in East Germany in 1968, who introduced him to the work of Konstantin Buteyko. Mew went on to develop the concept of facial growth guidance, which he called Orthotropics, and the Biobloc system of treatment, involving the use of a palate expanding appliance followed by a postural appliance. He practiced Orthotropics for 30 years and was involved in founding the International Association of Facial Growth Guidance in 1987 in Fort Worth, Texas.

Mew has written several scientific papers and two textbooks about the Biobloc technique, the second of which has been translated into seven different languages.

Mewing 
"Mewing" is a form of do-it-yourself oral posture training named after John Mew and his son Michael Mew (born  1969). Mewing received mainstream media coverage in 2019, with articles in many tabloid papers and an interview with John Mew’s son Michael on This Morning with Eamonn Holmes. A noticeable role in the popularization of mewing was played by before-and-after photos published on Reddit, which are virally spread in social networks and claim to prove the effectiveness of mewing.

In brief the principles are:
 rest the whole of the tongue on the roof of the mouth (against the palate – not blocking the airways)
 keep the teeth and lips gently closed
 breathe only through the nose
 chew food well before swallowing
 swallow chewed food at the back of the mouth without engaging the lip and buccinator muscles.

Although Mew's theory has some plausible conclusions, most orthodontists do not recommend mewing, as it has insufficient backing evidence to be justified as a sound treatment and is not considered a viable alternative treatment to orthognathic surgery.

Controversy 
John Mew’s views on the aetiology and best treatment process for malocclusion have met opposition from mainstream British orthodontists. Mew was fined by the NHS for providing inappropriate treatment. He appealed against the then Minister of Health in the High Court in 1987 and Lord Justice Murray Stuart-Smith judged that "these very serious strictures were wholly unwarranted and perhaps go some way to justify the applicant’s doubts as to the impartiality of the Dental Services Committee". He found in favor of Mew and awarded costs.

After he published research suggesting that traditional orthodontic treatment could cause facial damage, Dr. Mew had difficulty getting papers published in the UK. One paper took 23 years and was rejected 15 times before finally being published in The American Journal of Orthodontics and Dentofacial Orthopaedic. Another paper, a study of identical twins treated by different methods, took 15 years to get published.

Mew has never been invited to talk at the British Orthodontic Conference, despite addressing equivalent societies globally. This mirrors other unorthodox British orthodontists such as William J. Clark, who was not invited to present a paper on the Twin Block Appliance which he invented and is used internationally.

Advocacy 
John Mew has spent most of his life actively advocating for a reduction in orthognathic surgery and ensuring patients knew about less invasive alternatives before consenting to surgery. He started his career as an orthognathic surgeon and came to believe that most cases reverted or did not serve the patient well. He advocates simple maxims that align with paleoanthropological view on developing good jaws and teeth: breathe through your nose, not your mouth; chew hard food; stand up straight.

Mew argues that orthodontic patients in the UK are not given fully informed consent, because they are not told about alternative treatment methods such as Orthotropics. This culminated in Mew taking out a newspaper advertisement to proclaim his opinion that the General Dental Council suppressed information about alternatives. In 2010 the GDC reprimanded Mew for accusing the GDC of promoting surgery for jaw misalignment when there were non-surgical alternatives.

Personal life 
Aged 18, shortly after the end of the Second World War, Mew learnt to fly a Tiger Moth. He subsequently took up fixed wing gliding and later hang gliding. At 19 he built his own sports car, fabricating much of it from scratch. Between 1957 and 1967 he was involved in motor racing, moving from Formula Three to Formula One. He was one of the last private entrants, entering events all over Europe. In 1963 he twice broke the Formula One club circuit record at Brands Hatch, beating times set by World Champions Jim Clark, and John Surtees. In 1958 he was selected for the British Team for the first post-war challenge for the Americas Cup, though he was subsequently unable to participate in the event itself. In 1971 he was selected to crew for John Prentice, captain for the British International 14 dingy racing team in Annapolis, USA, where Britain came second. John Mew and his crew Michael Moss took second place at the World 14 Foot Anniversary Championships. Cowes 1974.

Between 1993 and 1999 Mew built a reproduction moated castle in a valley in Sussex, which was featured on the TV programme Britain's Best Home.

References 

British dentists
1928 births
Living people